Kadi Sesay (born 4 March 1949) is a Sierra Leonean politician, feminist, pro-democracy advocate and the vice presidential candidate of the Sierra Leone People's Party (SLPP). She served as Sierra Leone Minister of Trade and Industry from 2002 to 2007. She is the founder and Managing Director of Leone Consulting & Advisory Services – for Trade, Investment and Development. She is the mother of CNN International news anchor Isha Sesay.

Early life and academic career 
Kadi Sesay was born on 4 March 1949 in Rotifunk, Moyamba District, in Southern Sierra Leone, then a British Crown Colony, to parents from the Temne ethnic group from rural chieftaincy town of Rhombe, Lokomasama Chiefdom, Port Loko District in the Northern Province of Sierra Leone. She received her primary education from the EUB Primary School in Rotifunk, Moyamba District.

Sesay graduated from Fourah Bay College in Freetown in 1973 with a BA (Hons) degree in English Language and Literature. In 1974, she earned an MA degree in African literature at the University of Sheffield in the United Kingdom and took her PhD degree in Applied Linguistics at the University of London.

Political career 
Sesay was a lecturer at Fourah Bay College for 20 years and became Head of the English Department. She spent 6 years chairperson for the National Commission for Democracy and Human Rights (NCDHR). She is the first woman in Sierra Leonean history to head a national commission. She left this post to serve as Minister of Development and Economic Planning which she did for 3 years. She was the Presidential running mate to Rtd. Brigadier Gen. Julius Madda Bio for the 2012 General Elections. Sesay is the first woman to run for the office of vice-president in the history of Sierra Leone.

Feminism 
Sesay has championed local campaigns for more women to participate in politics.
She is currently the running mate of the opposition party for the 2012 General Elections.

Private life 
Sesay is a widow and the mother of three adult children. She resides in Freetown and has been hailed in the local media as "one of the most beautiful women Sierra Leone ever produced". She is the mother of CNN International news anchor Isha Sesay.

References 

1949 births
Living people
Alumni of St. Edward's Secondary School, Freetown
Fourah Bay College alumni
Alumni of the University of Sheffield
Alumni of the UCL Institute of Education
Academic staff of Fourah Bay College
Temne people
Sierra Leone People's Party politicians
Sierra Leonean women academics
Sierra Leonean women vice-presidential candidates
Government ministers of Sierra Leone
People from Moyamba District
Women government ministers of Sierra Leone